Mother Madar, is a 1989 Iranian drama film directed by Ali Hatami.

Cast
 Rogheyeh Chehreh-Azad - Mother
 Mohamad Ali Keshavarz - Mohammad Ebrahim
 Farimah Farjami - Mah Monir, The young mother
 Amin Tarokh - Jalaleddin, The young father
 Akbar Abdi - Gholamreza
 Akram_Mohammadi - Mah Taleat, The young sister
 Hamid_Jebeli - Mehdi
 Jamshid_Hashempour - Jamal
 Hamideh_Kheirabadi -Touba
 Mahboobeh Bayat - Mahin
 Hossein Kasbian - Bagher
 Mohammad Abhari - Police
 Mahmoud Basiri - cobbler
 Mahmoud Lotfi

References

External links
 

1989 drama films
1989 films
Iranian drama films
Persian-language films